Air Vice Marshal Suryakant Chintaman Chafekar AVSM, SC is a retired Indian Air Force (IAF) officer who served as the Senior Air and Administration Staff Officer, Maintenance Command, IAF, from 1 July 2016 until he retired on 30 September 2017. He was the commanding officer of No. 48 Squadron IAF. During his career he landed Antonov An-32 aircraft on High Altitude Advanced Landing Grounds (HAALG)s in Daulat Beg Oldi, Fukche and Nyoma.

Early life and education

Suryakant Chintaman Chafekar was born on 27 September 1959 at Nagpur, Maharashtra, to Captain Chintaman Vishnu Chafekar and Vijaya Chintaman Chafekar. Captain Chintaman Vishnu Chafekar was an officer in the Indian Territorial Army and a social activist. Vijaya Chintaman Chafekar was a school principal from Nagpur.

Suryakant Chintaman Chafekar is an alumnus of Dharampeth Science College, Nagpur; Air Force Academy, Dundigal; Flying Instructors School; Defence Services Staff College, Wellington, Tamil Nadu; and College of Air Warfare, Secunderabad.

Military career

Chafekar was commissioned as a pilot officer in the transport stream of the IAF on 29 December 1982. He has held several important command, staff and instructor appointments during his career. He was considered to be an expert in flying fixed wing aircraft in the Himalayan Region, and supervised humanitarian assistance and disaster relief tasks such as flood and earthquake relief operations.

On 18 February 2002, during a trial landing at Kargil airfield near the Pakistan border his aircraft was fired upon by a Pakistani missile that hit one of the engines, setting the aircraft on fire. He continued to fly the aircraft with only one operational engine, and landed it at IAF airfield at Leh.

He was awarded the Shaurya Chakra by the President of India for this mission.

During his career Chafekar was also awarded the Ati Vishisht Seva Medal by the President of India for his service to the Indian Air Force, from which he retired on 30 September 2017.

Notable appointments

Honours and awards

 Ati Vishisht Seva Medal – Citation: "Distinguished service of an exceptional order in the Indian Air Force", 2015
 Shaurya Chakra – Citation: "Planned and executed the Antonov An-32 landing at Daulat Beg Oldi during tenure of Commanding Officer of No. 48 Squadron IAF", 2009
Lakshmi Bai Tilak Award for Best Autobiography– Citation: Air Vice Marshal Suryakant Chintaman Chafekar AVSM, SC is being awarded Best Autobiography Literature Award 2021 for his book Nilaeechya Chatta by Maharashtra Sahitya Parishad, Pune, India
Rashtriya Sant Tukdoji Maharaj Smruti Puraskar – Citation: Air Vice Marshal Suryakant Chintaman Chafekar AVSM, SC is being awarded Best Autobiography Literature Award 2021-22 for his book Nilaeechya Chatta by Vidarbha Sahitya Sangha, Nagpur, India

Dates of rank

Post retirement

He has published his autobiography in 2 languages- Nilaeechya Chatta (Marathi, published September 2021), Shades of Blue (English, published November 2021). These books have been published by Rajhans Prakashan, Pune, India. He has been awarded Lakshmi Bai Tilak Award for Best Autobiography (Marathi) for year 2021 by Maharashtra Sahitya Parishad, Pune, India.   He has also been awarded Rashtriya Sant Tukdoji Maharaj Smruti Puraskar for Best Autobiography (Marathi) for year 2021-22 by Vidarbha Sahitya Sangha, Nagpur, India. 

He also works as a defence analyst and publishes articles in many Indian newspapers including The Hitavada, The Times of India, and Loksatta.

Military awards and decorations

References

Living people
1959 births
Indian Air Force officers
Recipients of the Ati Vishisht Seva Medal
Recipients of the Shaurya Chakra
College of Air Warfare alumni
Defence Services Staff College alumni